The Canada women's national rugby sevens team was one of six "core teams" that competed in all four rounds of the inaugural World Rugby Women's Sevens Series in 2012–13. Canada competed at the 2016 Summer Olympics and won the bronze medal after defeating Great Britain 33-10. At the 2020 Olympics they failed to medal and finished in 9th place.

They participated at the 2021 Canada Women's Sevens in Vancouver and Edmonton. Canada finished third at both tournaments.

Tournament history
A red box around the year indicates tournaments played within Canada

Summer Olympics

World Rugby Women's Sevens Series

Results by season

Totals

Last updated: 5 January 2023.

Rugby World Cup Sevens

Pan American Games

Commonwealth Games

Team

Current squad
Squad for the 2021–22 World Rugby Women's Sevens Series.

Sevens Series player records

Last updated: 5 January 2023.
Note:  Bold indicates active in 2022-23 season.

References

External links
Official website
WorldRugby profile

sevens
Women's national rugby sevens teams
World Rugby Women's Sevens Series core teams